Schippers is a Dutch occupational surname meaning skipper's. Notable people with the surname include:

Dafne Schippers (born 1992), Dutch heptathlete and sprinter
Daniela Schippers (born 1995), Guatemalan tennis player
David Schippers, American lawyer
Edith Schippers (born 1964), Dutch politician
K. Schippers (born 1936), Dutch poet, prose writer and art critic
Paulina Schippers (born 1991), Guatemalan tennis player
Thomas Schippers (1930–1977), American conductor
Willem Schippers (1867-1954), Dutch author, metalworker
Wim T. Schippers (born 1942), Dutch artist, comedian and voice actor

See also
 Schipper

Dutch-language surnames
Occupational surnames